Matt Roik (born November 17, 1979 in Dunnville, Ontario) is a professional lacrosse goaltender who has played in the National Lacrosse League. Roik most recently played for the Toronto Rock, and has also played for the Washington Stealth, San Jose Stealth, Chicago Shamrox, Philadelphia Wings, Anaheim Storm, and New Jersey Storm.

NLL career 
Roik was selected with the final pick (72nd overall) of the 1999 NLL Entry Draft by the Toronto Rock, but was subsequently traded to the New Jersey Storm. He played two seasons in New Jersey, and stayed with the organization as they moved to Anaheim. After two seasons in Anaheim, the Storm folded, and Roik was acquired by the San Jose Stealth in the Anaheim dispersal draft. Before ever playing with the Stealth, Roik was dealt to the Philadelphia Wings in exchange for the sixth pick in the 2005 draft.

Roik played two seasons in Philadelphia before being traded once again, this time to the Chicago Shamrox in March 2008. On August 29, 2008, Roik was part of a blockbuster trade, going to San Jose in return for All-Star goalie Anthony Cosmo.

Roik has been named the NLL's Defensive Player of the Week five times: 
 Week 5 -- 2012
 Week 1 -- 2006
 Week 14 -- 2005 (also named "Overall" Player of the Week)
 Week 1 -- 2003
 Week 14 -- 2002

While with the Wings, Roik was named as the Wings' "Grassroots Marketing Coordinator" in an effort to grow new fan support and increase ticket sales.

After three seasons with the Stealth, Roik was traded to the Toronto Rock for Kyle Ross in July 2011, but only ten games into the 2012 season, Roik was released by the Rock.

OLA / WLA career
Roik is currently a member of the Barrie Lakeshores of Major Series Lacrosse (sanctioned by the Ontario Lacrosse Association) where he plays under Wings Head Coach Lindsay Sanderson.

Roik was a member of the 2003 Mann Cup Champion Victoria Shamrocks of the Western Lacrosse Association, and was named MVP of the 2000 Minto Cup while he was a member of the Burnaby Lakers.

Statistics

NLL
Reference:

References

External links 
 Roik signed to be Philadelphia Wings Grassroots Marketing Coordinator

1979 births
Living people
Brock University alumni
Canadian lacrosse players
Chicago Shamrox players
National Lacrosse League All-Stars
Philadelphia Wings players
San Jose Stealth players
Sportspeople from Haldimand County
Toronto Rock players
Washington Stealth players
Lacrosse people from Ontario